Psoricoptera is a genus of moths in the family Gelechiidae. The genus was erected by Henry Tibbats Stainton in 1854.

Species
Psoricoptera arenicolor Omelko, 1999
Psoricoptera gibbosella (Zeller, 1839)
Psoricoptera kawabei Park & Karsholt, 1999
Psoricoptera latignathosa Park & Karsholt, 1999
Psoricoptera speciosella Teich, 1893

Former species
Psoricoptera melanoptila Lower, 1897

References

, 1999: Revision of the genus Psoricoptera Stainton, 1854 (Lepidoptera: Gelechiidae), with the description of two new Asian species. Entomologica Fennica 10 (1): 35-49.

 
Gelechiini